The 1992–1993 season was the 114th season in Bolton Wanderers F.C.'s existence, and their fifth successive season in the third tier of English Football, now renamed the Football League Second Division after the formation of the FA Premier League. This article covers the period from 1 July 1992 to 30 June 1993.

Playing Squad

Results

Barclays League Division Two

FA Cup

Coca-Cola Cup

Associate Members Cup

Top scorers

References

Bolton Wanderers
Bolton Wanderers F.C. seasons